Reetta Sofi Kaarina Hurske (born 15 May 1995) is a Finnish athlete specialising in the sprint hurdles. She won the gold medal in the 60 metres hurdles at the 2023 European Indoor Championships, winning Finland its first ever medal in this event, after finishing fourth at the 2019 edition. Hurske placed second in the 100 metres hurdles at the 2019 Universiade.

She represented her country at the 2020 Tokyo Olympics as well as the 2019 and 2022 World Athletics Championships. She is the Finnish indoor record holder for the 60 m hurdles, and won two individual national titles.

Hurske improved the Finnish record in the 60 m hurdles four times in 2023.

Statistics

Personal bests
 60 m hurdles – 7.79 (Madrid 2023) 
 60 metres indoor – 7.50 (Tampere 2023)
 100 m hurdles – 12.78 (+1.3 m/s, Joensuu 2019)
 100 metres – 12.10 (-0.6 m/s, Kauhava 2017)

International competitions

National titles
 Finnish Athletics Championships
 100 m hurdles: 2019
 Finnish Indoor Athletics Championships
 60 m hurdles: 2023
 4 × 200 m relay: 2013, 2018

References

1995 births
Living people
Finnish female hurdlers
People from Ikaalinen
Finnish Athletics Championships winners
World Athletics Championships athletes for Finland
Universiade silver medalists for Finland
Universiade medalists in athletics (track and field)
Competitors at the 2017 Summer Universiade
Medalists at the 2019 Summer Universiade
Athletes (track and field) at the 2020 Summer Olympics
Olympic athletes of Finland
Sportspeople from Pirkanmaa
21st-century Finnish women